Thota is an Indian surname found in the states of Andhra Pradesh and Telangana.

People with this surname include:

 Thota Tharani, Indian film art director and production designer
 Thota Vaikuntam, Indian painter
 Thota Narasimham, Indian politician
 Thota Thrimurthulu, Indian politician and a former MLA

See also 
 Thotapalli or Thota Palli, a village in Vizianagaram district, Andhra Pradesh

Indian surnames
Telugu-language surnames